Muiredach Ua Dubthaig (fl. 1208) was Bishop of Killala.

References

12th-century Roman Catholic bishops in Ireland
13th-century Roman Catholic bishops in Ireland
Bishops of Killala